Mary Sharp College (1851–1896), first known as the Tennessee and Alabama Female Institute, was a women's college, located in Winchester, Tennessee. It was named after the abolitionist Mary Sharp.

History
The college was first chartered in 1850 and was directed by Dr. Zuinglius Calvin Graves and the Baptist Church. It "was the first women's college in the United States to offer degrees equivalent to those offered at men's colleges."  

Graves offered a radical curriculum. He patterned the classical curriculum at Mary Sharp College after those offered at Amherst College, Brown University, and the University of Virginia. He emphasized religious and moral training and required every student to attend chapel. Students at Mary Sharp, unlike those at other female colleges and academies, studied algebra, geometry, and trigonometry; Latin and Greek; English literature, grammar, and composition; ancient, English, and American history; philosophy and rhetoric; geography and geology; and botany, chemistry, astronomy, and physiology.

The college awarded its first degrees in 1855. The economic depression of the 1890s led to its closure in 1896.

Notable people
 Adelia Cleopatra Graves (1821-1895), educator, author, poet
 Eva Munson Smith (1843–1915), composer, poet, author

See also
 Female seminary
 Timeline of women's colleges in the United States

References

Further reading
"Scholarship to Memorialize Dr. Graves." The Truth and Herald. April 22, 1926.

External links
Bibliography of texts on Mary Sharp College
The Mary Sharp Project

Former women's universities and colleges in the United States
Educational institutions established in 1851
Female seminaries in the United States
Defunct private universities and colleges in Tennessee
History of women in Tennessee
1851 establishments in Tennessee
Winchester, Tennessee